Ab Hendu (also Romanized as Āb Hendū, Ab Hendoo, and Ābhendū; also known as Āb-e Hendī, Āb Hadīr, Āb Hendī, and Āb-i-Hindi) is a village in Gonbad Rural District, in the Central District of Hamadan County, Hamadan Province, Iran. At the 2006 census, its population was 223, in 44 families.

References 

Populated places in Hamadan County